Campylium stellatum is a species of moss belonging to the family Amblystegiaceae.

It has cosmopolitan distribution.

References

Hypnales